This is a list of sensors sorted by sensor type.

Acoustic, sound, vibration  
Geophone
Hydrophone
Microphone
Pickup
Seismometer
Sound locator

Automotive 
Air flow meter
AFR sensor
Air–fuel ratio meter
Blind spot monitor
Crankshaft position sensor (CKP)
Curb feeler
Defect detector
Engine coolant temperature sensor 
Hall effect sensor
Wheel speed sensor
Airbag sensors
Automatic transmission speed sensor
Brake fluid pressure sensor
Camshaft position sensor (CMP)
Cylinder Head Temperature gauge
Engine crankcase pressure sensor
Exhaust gas temperature sensor
Fuel level sensor
Fuel pressure sensor
Knock sensor
Light sensor
MAP sensor
Mass airflow sensor
Oil level sensor
Oil pressure sensor
Omniview technology
Oxygen sensor (O2)
Parking sensor
Radar gun
Radar sensor
Speed sensor
Throttle position sensor
Tire pressure sensor
Torque sensor
Transmission fluid temperature sensor
Turbine speed sensor
Variable reluctance sensor
Vehicle speed sensor
Water-in-fuel sensor
Wheel speed sensor
ABS sensors

Chemical 
Breathalyzer
Carbon dioxide sensor
Carbon monoxide detector
Catalytic bead sensor
Chemical field-effect transistor
Chemiresistor
Electrochemical gas sensor
Electronic nose
Electrolyte–insulator–semiconductor sensor
Energy-dispersive X-ray spectroscopy
Fluorescent chloride sensors
Holographic sensor
Hydrocarbon dew point analyzer
Hydrogen sensor
Hydrogen sulfide sensor
Infrared point sensor
Ion-selective electrode
ISFET
Nondispersive infrared sensor
Microwave chemistry sensor
Morphix Chameleon
Nitrogen oxide sensor
Nondispersive infrared sensor
Olfactometer
Optode
Oxygen sensor
Ozone monitor
Pellistor
pH glass electrode
Potentiometric sensor 
Redox electrode
Smoke detector
Zinc oxide nanorod sensor

Electric current, electric potential, magnetic, radio
Current sensor
Daly detector
Electroscope
Electron multiplier
Faraday cup
Galvanometer
Hall effect sensor
Hall probe
Magnetic anomaly detector
Magnetometer
Magnetoresistance
MEMS magnetic field sensor
Metal detector
Planar Hall sensor
Radio direction finder
Test light
Voltage detector

Environment, weather, moisture, humidity 
Actinometer
Air pollution sensor
Bedwetting alarm
Ceilometer
Dew warning
Electrochemical gas sensor
Fish counter
Frequency domain sensor
Gas detector
Hook gauge evaporimeter
Humistor
Hygrometer
Leaf sensor
Lysimeter
Pyranometer
Pyrgeometer
Psychrometer
Rain gauge
Rain sensor
Seismometer
SNOTEL
Snow gauge
Soil moisture sensor
Stream gauge
Tide gauge
Weather radar

Flow, fluid velocity
Air flow meter
Anemometer
Flow sensor
Gas meter
Mass flow sensor
Water meter

Ionizing radiation, subatomic particles 
Bubble chamber
Cloud chamber
Geiger counter
Geiger–Müller tube
Ionization chamber
Gaseous ionization detectors
Neutron detection
Particle detector
Proportional counter
Scintillator
Scintillation counter
Semiconductor detector
Thermoluminescent dosimeter
Wire chamber

Navigation instruments
Airspeed indicator
Altimeter
Attitude indicator
Depth gauge
Fluxgate compass
Gyroscope
Inertial navigation system
Inertial reference unit
 Machmeter
Magnetic compass
MHD sensor
Ring laser gyroscope
Sextant
Turn coordinator
Variometer
Vibrating structure gyroscope
Yaw-rate sensor

Position, angle, displacement, distance, speed, acceleration 
Accelerometer
Auxanometer
Capacitive displacement sensor
Capacitive sensing
Flex sensor
Free fall sensor
Gravimeter
Gyroscopic sensor
Impact sensor
Inclinometer
Incremental encoder
Integrated circuit piezoelectric sensor
Laser rangefinder
Laser surface velocimeter
LIDAR
Linear encoder
Linear variable differential transformer (LVDT)
Liquid capacitive inclinometers
Odometer
Photoelectric sensor
Piezoelectric accelerometer
Position sensor
Position sensitive device
Angular rate sensor
Rotary encoder
Rotary variable differential transformer
Selsyn
Shock detector
Shock data logger
Sudden Motion Sensor
Tilt sensor
Tachometer
Ultrasonic thickness gauge
Ultra-wideband radar
Variable reluctance sensor
Velocity receiver
Magnetic sensor

Optical, light, imaging, photon 
Charge-coupled device
CMOS sensor
Angle–sensitive pixel
Colorimeter
Contact image sensor
Electro-optical sensor
Flame detector
Infra-red sensor
Kinetic inductance detector 
LED as light sensor
Light-addressable potentiometric sensor
Nichols radiometer
Fiber optic sensors
Optical position sensor
Thermopile laser sensors
Photodetector
Photodiode
Photomultiplier
Photomultiplier tube
Phototransistor
Photoelectric sensor
Photoionization detector 
Photomultiplier
Photoresistor
Photoswitch
Phototube
Scintillometer
Shack–Hartmann wavefront sensor
Single-photon avalanche diode
Superconducting nanowire single-photon detector
Transition-edge sensor
Visible Light Photon Counter
Wavefront sensor

Pressure
Barograph
Barometer
Boost gauge
Bourdon gauge
Hot filament ionization gauge
Ionization gauge
McLeod gauge
Oscillating U-tube
Permanent downhole gauge
Piezometer
Pirani gauge
Pressure sensor
Pressure gauge
Tactile sensor
Time pressure gauge

Force, density, level
Bhangmeter
Hydrometer
Force gauge and Force Sensor
Level sensor
Load cell
Magnetic level gauge
Nuclear density gauge
Piezocapacitive pressure sensor
Piezoelectric sensor
Strain gauge
Torque sensor
Viscometer

Thermal, heat, temperature 
Bolometer
Bimetallic strip
Calorimeter
Exhaust gas temperature gauge
Flame detection
Gardon gauge
Golay cell
Heat flux sensor
Infrared thermometer
Microbolometer
Microwave radiometer
Net radiometer
Quartz thermometer
Resistance thermometer
Silicon bandgap temperature sensor
Special sensor microwave/imager
Temperature gauge
Thermistor
Thermocouple
Thermometer
Phosphor thermometry
Pyrometer

Proximity, presence
Alarm sensor
Doppler radar
Motion detector
Occupancy sensor
Proximity sensor
Passive infrared sensor
Reed switch
Stud finder
Triangulation sensor
Touch switch
Wired glove

Sensor technology
Active pixel sensor
Back-illuminated sensor
BioFET
Biochip
Biosensor
Capacitance probe
Capacitance sensor
Catadioptric sensor
Carbon paste electrode
Digital sensors
Displacement receiver
Electromechanical film
Electro-optical sensor
Electrochemical fatigue crack sensor
Fabry–Pérot interferometer
Fiber Bragg grating
Fisheries acoustics
Image sensor
Image sensor format
Inductive sensor
Intelligent sensor
Lab-on-a-chip
Leaf sensor
Machine vision
Microelectromechanical systems
MOSFET
Photoelasticity
Quantum sensor
Radar
Ground-penetrating radar
Synthetic aperture radar
Radar tracker
Stretch sensor
Sensor array
Sensor fusion
Sensor grid
Sensor node
Soft sensor
Sonar
Staring array
Tapered element oscillating microbalance (TEOM)
Transducer
Ultrasonic sensor
Video sensor
Visual sensor network
Wheatstone bridge
Wireless sensor network

Speed sensor
Speed sensors are machines used to detect the speed of an object, usually a transport vehicle. They include:

Wheel speed sensors
Speedometers
Pitometer logs
Pitot tubes
Airspeed indicators
Piezo sensors (e.g. in a road surface)
LIDAR
Ground speed radar
Doppler radar
ANPR (where vehicles are timed over a fixed distance)
Laser surface velocimeters for moving surfaces

Others
Actigraphy
Air pollution sensor
Analog image processing
Atomic force microscopy
Atomic Gravitational Wave Interferometric Sensor
Attitude control (spacecraft): Horizon sensor, Earth sensor, Sun sensor
Catadioptric sensor
Chemoreceptor
Compressive sensing
Cryogenic particle detectors
Dew warning
Diffusion tensor imaging
Digital holography
Electronic tongue
Fine Guidance Sensor
Flat panel detector
Functional magnetic resonance imaging
Glass break detector
Heartbeat sensor
Hyperspectral sensors
IRIS (Biosensor), Interferometric Reflectance Imaging Sensor
Laser beam profiler
Littoral Airborne Sensor/Hyperspectral
LORROS
Millimeter wave scanner
Magnetic resonance imaging
Moire deflectometry
Molecular sensor
Nanosensor
Nano-tetherball Sensor
Omnidirectional camera
Organoleptic sensors
Optical coherence tomography
Phase unwrapping techniques
Polygraph Truth Detection
Positron emission tomography
Push broom scanner
Quantization (signal processing)
Range imaging
Scanning SQUID microscope
Single-Photon Emission Computed Tomography (SPECT)
Smartdust
SQUID, Superconducting quantum interference device
SSIES, Special Sensors-Ions, Electrons, and Scintillation thermal plasma analysis package
SSMIS, Special Sensor Microwave Imager / Sounder
Structured-light 3D scanner
Sun sensor, Attitude control (spacecraft)
Superconducting nanowire single-photon detector
Thin-film thickness monitor
Time-of-flight camera
TriDAR, Triangulation and LIDAR Automated Rendezvous and Docking
Unattended Ground Sensors

References

 Global List of Sensor Manufacturers List of commercial sensor manufacturers from around the world

Electrical components
Technology-related lists